Shuko Aoyama and Erika Sema were the defending champions, having won the last edition in 2012 as an ITF tournament, but Sema chose not to participate. Aoyama partnered alongside Aleksandra Krunić, but lost in the semifinals to Margarita Gasparyan and Monica Niculescu.

Darija Jurak and María José Martínez Sánchez won the title, defeating Gasparyan and Niculescu in the final, 7–5, 2–6, [10–7].

Seeds

Draw

Draw

References

External links
Main Draw

Bronx Open - Doubles
2019 Doubles